This is a list of records relating to members of the Canadian Parliament.

Age

Youngest

The youngest ever MP is currently Pierre-Luc Dusseault, elected in the general election of 2011 at the age of 19 years and 11 months for the riding of Sherbrooke. He succeeded former Liberal Party MP, Claude-André Lachance, who was elected in the federal election of 1974. Lachance was 20 years and 3 months old when elected.

Laurin Liu, age 20, was elected to Parliament at the 2011 Canadian Federal Election.  She represents  the riding Rivière-des-Mille-Îles. In the same election,  Charmaine Borg, a mere 10 days older than Liu, won election to Parliament as the representative of Terrebonne—Blainville. Other women under the age of 24 elected to the same parliament include Ève Péclet, 21, and Mylène Freeman, 22.

Oldest
The oldest MP was William Anderson Black who was first elected to the House of Commons of Canada in the 1923 by-election for the riding of Halifax. At the time of election Mr. Black was 76 years, 1 month, 26 days old. He held his seat until his death on 1 September 1934 at the age of 86 years, 10 months and 22 days.

Period of service

Longest

Wilfrid Laurier was an MP for 44 years and 11 months between January 22, 1874 and February 17, 1919, although his tenure was not continuous. He did serve continuously for 41 years and 2 months from November 28, 1877 to February 17, 1919, making him also the MP with the longest continuous service.

Mackenzie Bowell served as a parliamentarian continuously for over 50 years. Bowell was elected to the 1st Canadian Parliament in 1867 and served continuously as an MP until 1892, when he was appointed to the Senate, retaining his position in Cabinet and becoming Leader of the Government in the Senate in 1893. While a Senator, he served as the fifth Prime Minister of Canada. After resigning as Prime Minister, he continued to serve in the Senate until his death in 1917, marking 50 years, 2 months, and 4 days of continuous service throughout the first half-century of Canada's history.

No period of service
John Dahmer died on 26 November 1988, five days after being elected, before he could be officially sworn in as an MP.

References

Related link
 Electoral firsts in Canada

Members of Parliament